Made in India is an Indi-pop album by Alisha Chinai, with production by Biddu, released in 1995. It was the first album by an Indian pop (Indipop) artist to be sold on a scale comparable to Hindi film music albums, with over fivemillion copies sold in India. The album established Indipop as a discrete genre and its singer Chinai became the genre's main proponent.

Development
Biddu originally wrote the song "Made in India" for the famous Pakistani popstar Nazia Hassan, who Biddu had previously worked with. However, Hassan refused to come out of retirement for the song, as she thought the lyrics may offend her fans in Pakistan. After Hassan rejected the offer, Biddu then wrote the song for Alisha Chinai.

Reception
Made in India went on to become one of the highest selling pop albums of its time and Chinai became a household name. The record sold over 5million copies in India, and the album's title song was not only a hit in India but across the international market as well, topping charts across Asia. Chinai thereafter became the central figure of the emergence of Indipop. Made in India was the first ever Indian pop album to achieve commercial success on a par with Indian film music albums and it also marked a spectacular beginning to the era of Indian music videos. It also became the first non-film album to break unit sales records in India.

Controversy
During the release of Made in India, Chinai had accused Anu Malik of molesting her. Some claim it was a publicity stunt by the singer to promote her album. Thereafter, Malik and Chinai did not work for several years, only to reunite in 2003 with Ishq Vishk. Chinai had also accused Magnasound Records of cheating her of her royalties. The music company counter-sued her for defamation.

Track listing 
 Made in India / मेड इन इंडिया
 Lover Girl / लवर गर्ल
 Dil / दिल
 Tu Kahaan / तू कहाँ
 Ek Baar Do Baar / एक बार दो बार
 Aajaa / आजा
 Mere Saath / मेरे साथ
 Oo La La / ऊ ला ला
 Dhadkan / धड़कन
 Made in India (Remix)
 De De / देदे

Awards
 Alisha Chinai received the International Billboard Award and also won the Freddie Mercury Award for Artistic Excellence for the album Made in India.

Other versions 
In 2017, "Made in India" was recreated by Pawni Pandey. In 2022, it was recreated by the Indian American hip hop artist Raja Kumari with different lyrics.

References

1995 albums
Albums produced by Biddu
Alisha Chinai albums
Magnasound Records albums
Hindi-language albums